Theodore Clay Pilcher (March 20, 1844 – December 7, 1917) was an American Democratic politician who served as a member of the Virginia Senate, representing the state's 11th district from 1916 until his death just under two years later. From 1891 to 1901, he represented Fauquier County in the House of Delegates.

Early life and military service
Pilcher was born in Warrenton, Virginia on March 20, 1844. He was the fourth and youngest child of Alexander Spottswood Pilcher, a farmer and Frances Pitt Pilcher (née Shumate).

On February 5, 1863, at the age of eighteen, Pilcher enlisted in the Confederate States Army, wishing to fight in the ongoing American Civil War. He served as a private with Company H of the 4th Virginia Cavalry Regiment, also known as the "Black Horse Cavalry," until the end of the war two years later.

Career

Pilcher first held political office in 1891 when he was elected as a Democrat to represent Fauquier County in the Virginia House of Delegates. After this, he represented his home county for four subsequent two-year terms. He succeeded his older brother, Julius, who served two terms in that position. In 1901, Pilcher retired to his farm, spending the next fourteen years mostly staying out of politics.

In 1915, Pilcher reentered public life, making a run for the 11th district seat in the Virginia state senate. He was successful, representing the district, which was then composed of Fauquier and Loudoun, during the General Assembly's 1916 session.

Pilcher died in his hometown on December 7, 1917. His replacement in the Senate, Lucien Keith was sworn in on the first day of the General Assembly's next session, January 10, 1918, and the body was later that day adjourned in his memory.

Personal life
Pilcher married Ada George on December 5, 1867. The couple had two sons, John and George. George's eldest son (also named Theodore Clay) represented Norfolk City in the House of Delegates from 1954 to 1965.

Pilcher is buried in Midland Cemetery in Fauquier.

References

External links
 
 

1844 births
1917 deaths
People from Warrenton, Virginia
Democratic Party Virginia state senators
19th-century American politicians
20th-century American politicians
People of Virginia in the American Civil War